"Jak nie my to kto" (English: "If not us, then who") is a Polish-language single recorded by Mrozu and featuring Tomson. The song mostly features elements of blues and rock and roll and refers to 1960s music. It was released on the YouTube platform on 18 December 2013, and was later included on the platinum-certified album Rollercoaster, which was released on 11 March 2014.

The song was directed by Mrozu and Robert "DrySkull" Krawczyk, and the artistic supervision of Marcin Bors. It additionally featured the chorus by Patrycja Gola.

It reached high places on various record charts in Poland, including a first place on the RMF FM's Poplista. By July 2021, the song's music video had almost 15.8 million views.

Chart performance

Weekly and daily charts

Personnel 
 vocals: Mrozu, Tomson
 chorus: Patrycja Gola
 Direction: Mrozu, Robert "DrySkull" Krawczyk
 Artistic supervision: Marcin Bors

References 

2013 songs
2013 singles
Polish-language songs
Number-one singles in Poland
Rock-and-roll songs
Blues rock songs